JAG or Jag may refer to:

People
 Jag Bhaduria (born 1940), Canadian former politician
 James A. Garfield (1831-1881), 20th U.S. president
 James Alexander Gordon (announcer) (born 1938), BBC radio broadcaster known as "Jag"
 John Atkinson Grimshaw (1836–1893), Victorian-era artist who sometimes signed his early paintings "JAG"
 Michael Jagmin (born 1985), American rock singer
 Jag Mundhra (1948-2011), Indian filmmaker

Arts, entertainment, and media
 JAG (band), a Christian rock band that recorded during the early 1990s
 JAG (TV series), an American adventure/legal drama television series 
 "Jag", a song from The Mad Capsule Markets' 1999 album Osc-Dis
 CJAG-FM, a Canadian radio station branded as JAG 92.3

Brands and enterprises
 Jag, nickname for Jaguar Cars
 JAG Communications, UK mobile phone retailer

Military
 Judge Advocate General
 Judge Advocate General (Canada)
 Judge Advocate General's Corps (United States)
 PAF Base Shahbaz (IATA code: JAG), Pakistan Air Force base

Other uses
 Jags, nickname for the Jacksonville Jaguars
 Edward Byrne Memorial Justice Assistance Grant Program, US federal funding for local jurisdictions
 Jobs for America's Graduates

See also
 JAGS (disambiguation)
 Jaguar (disambiguation)

Lists of people by nickname